Rishma Gurung is a Nepalese actress and model who debuted in the film Kabaddi in 2013.

Filmography

References

Living people
Nepalese female models
People from Pokhara
1991 births
Gurung people
Nepalese film actresses
Actresses in Nepali cinema
21st-century Nepalese actresses